The 2004–05 QMJHL season was the 36th season in the history of the Quebec Major Junior Hockey League. The QMJHL inaugurates the Guy Carbonneau Trophy, awarded to the league's "Best Defensive Forward," and the Kevin Lowe Trophy, awarded to the league's "Best Defensive Defenceman." Sixteen teams played 70 games each in the schedule.

Sidney Crosby was the league's top scorer, regular season MVP, Playoff leading scorer, and playoff MVP. Crosby helped lead the Rimouski Océanic on a 28-game unbeaten streak to close out the season, and finishing first overall in the regular season winning their second Jean Rougeau Trophy. Rimouski extended its unbeaten streak to 35 games in the playoffs, and lost only once, en route to winning their second President's Cup, defeating the Halifax Mooseheads in the finals.

2004 QMJHL Entry Draft

First round picks 
1 James Sheppard (W) 1988-04-25 
2 Alex Lamontagne (D) 1988-04-07 
3 Jason Legault (D) 1988-02-23
4 Benjamin Breault (C) 1988-02-21 
5 Pier-Alexandre Poulin (C) 1988-02-18
6 Henrick Lavoie (W) 1988-01-14
7 Peter-James Corsi (C) 1988-08-03
8 Jonathan Bernier (G) 1988-08-07
9 Yannick Riendeau (W) 1988-06-18
10 Maxime Tanguay (C) 1988-11-16
11 Alex Biega (D) 1988-04-04
12 Guillaume Durand (D) 1988-02-02
13 Pascal Boutin (D) 1988-05-14
14 Wesley Welcher (C) 1987-09-14
15 Maxim Noreau (D) 1987-05-24
16 Nicolas Blanchard (C) 1987-05-31
 Source:

Final standings
Note: GP = Games played; W = Wins; L = Losses; T = Ties; OL = Overtime loss; PTS = Points; GF = Goals for; GA = Goals against

y-received first-round bye
x-made playoffs
complete list of standings.

Scoring leaders
Note: GP = Games played; G = Goals; A = Assists; Pts = Points; PIM = Penalty minutes

 complete scoring statistics

Canada-Russia Challenge
The 2004 ADT Canada-Russia Challenge was hosted by Quebec City and Montreal. On November 21, 2004, the Russian Selects defeated the QMJHL All-stars 4–3 in a shootout (2–0) at the Colisée Pepsi. On November 22, 2004, the Russian Selects defeated the QMJHL All-stars 4–3 in a shootout (3–0) at the Bell Centre. Since the tournament began in 2003, the Russian Selects had an all-time record of 3 wins and 1 loss versus the QMJHL All-stars.

Playoffs
Each regular season division winner received a first round bye, and ranked 1st, 2nd, and 3rd overall. Remaining teams were ranked 4th to 13th, regardless of division.

Sidney Crosby was the leading scorer of the playoffs with 31 points (14 goals, 17 assists).

All-star teams
Coaches were no longer named to all-star teams as of the 2004–05 season.

First team
 Goaltender - Julien Ellis, Shawinigan Cataractes 
 Left defence - Nicolas Marcotte, Chicoutimi Saguenéens 
 Right defence - Mario Scalzo, Victoriaville Tigres / Rimouski Océanic
 Left winger - Maxime Boisclair, Chicoutimi Saguenéens 
 Centreman - Marc-Antoine Pouliot, Rimouski Océanic 
 Right winger - Sidney Crosby, Rimouski Océanic

Second team  
 Goaltender - Corey Crawford, Moncton Wildcats 
 Left defence - Sam Roberts, Gatineau Olympiques 
 Right defence - Alexandre Picard, Lewiston Maineiacs 
 Left winger - Dany Roussin, Rimouski Océanic 
 Centreman - David Desharnais, Chicoutimi Saguenéens 
 Right winger - Alex Bourret, Lewiston Maineiacs

Rookie team  
 Goaltender - Maxime Joyal, Quebec Remparts 
 Left defence - Oskars Bartulis, Moncton Wildcats 
 Right defence - Kris Letang, Val-d'Or Foreurs 
 Left winger - Vyacheslav Trukhno, P.E.I. Rocket 
 Centreman - Derick Brassard, Drummondville Voltigeurs 
 Right winger - Alexander Radulov, Quebec Remparts 
 List of First/Second/Rookie team all-stars.

Trophies and awards
Team
President's Cup - Playoff Champions, Rimouski Océanic
Jean Rougeau Trophy - Regular Season Champions, Rimouski Océanic
Luc Robitaille Trophy - Team that scored the most goals, Rimouski Océanic
Robert Lebel Trophy - Team with best GAA, Halifax Mooseheads
Player
Michel Brière Memorial Trophy - Most Valuable Player, Sidney Crosby, Rimouski Océanic
Jean Béliveau Trophy - Top Scorer, Sidney Crosby, Rimouski Océanic
Guy Lafleur Trophy - Playoff MVP, Sidney Crosby, Rimouski Océanic    
Telus Cup – Offensive - Offensive Player of the Year, Sidney Crosby, Rimouski Océanic
Telus Cup – Defensive - Defensive Player of the Year, Martin Houle, Cape Breton Screaming Eagles
Jacques Plante Memorial Trophy - Best GAA, Julien Ellis, Shawinigan Cataractes
Guy Carbonneau Trophy - Best Defensive Forward, Simon Courcelles, Quebec Remparts
Emile Bouchard Trophy - Defenceman of the Year, Mario Scalzo, Rimouski Océanic & Victoriaville Tigres
Kevin Lowe Trophy - Best Defensive Defenceman, Nathan Saunders, Moncton Wildcats  
Mike Bossy Trophy - Best Pro Prospect, Sidney Crosby, Rimouski Oceanic
RDS Cup - Rookie of the Year, Derick Brassard, Drummondville Voltigeurs 
Michel Bergeron Trophy - Offensive Rookie of the Year, Derick Brassard, Drummondville Voltigeurs
Raymond Lagacé Trophy - Defensive Rookie of the Year, Maxime Joyal, Quebec Remparts
Frank J. Selke Memorial Trophy - Most sportsmanlike player, David Desharnais, Chicoutimi Saguenéens
QMJHL Humanitarian of the Year - Humanitarian of the Year, Guillaume Desbiens, Rouyn-Noranda Huskies   
Marcel Robert Trophy - Best Scholastic Player, Guillaume Demers, Cape Breton Screaming Eagles
Paul Dumont Trophy - Personality of the Year, Sidney Crosby, Rimouski Océanic

Executive
Ron Lapointe Trophy - Coach of the Year, Richard Martel, Chicoutimi Saguenéens       
John Horman Trophy - Executive of the Year, Eric Verrier, Drummondville Voltigeurs 
Jean Sawyer Trophy - Marketing Director of the Year, Michel Boivin, & Pierre Cardinal, Chicoutimi Saguenéens

See also
2005 Memorial Cup
2005 NHL Entry Draft
2004–05 OHL season
2004–05 WHL season

References

 Official QMJHL Website
 www.hockeydb.com/

Further reading
Hockey's Future: QMJHL 2004 draft review

Quebec Major Junior Hockey League seasons
QMJHL